Sall can refer to:

 Sall, Denmark, a village and a church parish in the Danish region of Midtjylland
 Sall, Norfolk, England
 Sall (patronymic), the patronymic of the Lam Toro dynasty of Senegal in the 15th century
 Sall (river), a river of Baden-Württemberg, Germany
 SALL, the symbol for the sal-like proteins:
 SALL1
 SALL2
 SALL3
 SALL4
 In Assembly language, the "shift arithmetic left long" command
 Andrew Sall (1612–1682), Irish Jesuit, later a convert to the Church of England
 Bob Sall (1908–1974), American racecar driver
 Agustín Millares Sall (1917–1989), Spanish poet
 John Sall (born 1948), American businessman and computer software developer

See also
 Sal (disambiguation)
 Salle (disambiguation)